The South Seas Classic was a professional golf tournament played at Pacific Harbour in Fiji from 1976 to 1979. Prize money was A$27,500 in 1976, A$30,000 in 1977 and 1978, and A$43,000 in 1979.

Winners

References 

Golf tournaments in Fiji